FC Trubnik Kamensk-Uralsky was a Russian football team from Kamensk-Uralsky. It played professionally in 1946, 1948–1949, 1960, 1963–1965 and 1994 to 1998. Their best result was 12th place in the Zone 2 of the second-highest Soviet First League in 1948 and 1949.

Team name history
 1946–1947 FC Tsvetmet Kamensk-Uralsky
 1948 FC Tsvetnyye Metally Kamensk-Uralsky
 1949 FC Tsvetmet Kamensk-Uralsky
 1960 FC Metallurg Kamensk-Uralsky
 1963–1965 FC Salyut Kamensk-Uralsky
 1992–1998 FC Trubnik Kamensk-Uralsky

External links
  Team history at KLISF

Association football clubs established in 1946
Association football clubs disestablished in 1999
Defunct football clubs in Russia
Sport in Sverdlovsk Oblast
1946 establishments in Russia
1999 disestablishments in Russia